Priyutny (masculine), Priyutnaya (feminine), or Priyutnoye (neuter) is the name of several rural localities in Russia:
Priyutny (rural locality), a khutor in Novoderevyankovsky Rural Okrug of Kanevskoy District in Krasnodar Krai; 
Priyutnoye, Republic of Kalmykia, a selo in Priyutnenskaya Rural Administration of Priyutnensky District in the Republic of Kalmykia; 
Priyutnoye, Orenburg Oblast, a selo in Priyutinsky Selsoviet of Totsky District in Orenburg Oblast